Daryoush Homayoun (19282011) was an Iranian journalist, author, intellectual, and politician. He was the Minister of Information and Tourism in the cabinet of Jamshid Amouzegar, founder of the daily newspaper Ayandegan, and one-time high-ranking member of the Rastakhiz party. In exile he became one of the founders of the Constitutionalist Party of Iran. He was famous for his analytical writings and largely impartial assessment of history. His outspoken manner, criticizing the Islamic Republic with harsh tones, but also directing his criticism at the Pahlavi policies, earned him respect of many, while at the same time creating many enemies. He was one of the most influential Iranian opposition leaders in exile.

Youth 
Homayoun was born in Tehran on 27 September 1928 and began his involvement in the political sphere at the age of fourteen. In his younger years he was a member of several Iranian parties, generally with nationalist views opposing the rise of leftist ideas and the influence of the Tudeh party, such as SUMKA. He began as a supporter of Mohammad Mossadegh but was imprisoned during Mossadegh's premiership.

Journalistic and political career 
In the years following 1953, Homayoun finished his university studies, obtaining a doctorate in political science from the University of Tehran. He worked at the Iranian daily Ettelaat and later founded the highly successful daily newspaper Ayandegan. In the cabinet of Jamshid Amouzegar, he became the minister of information and tourism. Following the events leading up to the Iranian Revolution, he was arrested in the autumn of 1978, together with many other former officials whom the monarchy tried to use as scapegoats in order to prevent its own eventual downfall. He escaped prison on 12 February 1979, just after the revolution, and went into hiding. Fifteen months later, he left Iran through the border with Turkey and went to Paris.

Exile 
In exile, Homayoun, was an influential political analyst, writer, and opposition leader. In the nineties he initiated and helped create the Constitutionalist Party of Iran, a political party seeking to establish a liberal democratic Iran.

Death 
Daryoush Homayoun died on 28 January 2011 in Geneva, Switzerland at the age of 82.

External links 
 Official Website
 Life, after dying before death, by D. Homayoun.
 A party for the present and future of Iran.

Government ministers of Iran
Iranian monarchists
1928 births
Constitutionalist Party of Iran politicians
Rastakhiz Party politicians
University of Tehran alumni
2011 deaths
Iranian emigrants to Switzerland
Exiles of the Iranian Revolution in Switzerland
Iranian emigrants to France
Exiles of the Iranian Revolution in France
Pan-Iranist Party politicians
Iran Novin Party politicians
National Front (Iran) people
Nation Party of Iran politicians
SUMKA politicians
Iranian nationalists
20th-century Iranian politicians
20th-century newspaper founders
Iranian newspaper publishers (people)